The Fire Island Lighthouse is a visible landmark on the Great South Bay, in southern Suffolk County, New York on the western end of Fire Island, a barrier island off the southern coast of Long Island. The lighthouse is located within Fire Island National Seashore and just to the east of Robert Moses State Park. It is part of the Fire Island Light Station which contains the light, keepers quarters, the lens building containing the original first-order Fresnel lens, and a boat house.

History

The current lighthouse is a  stone tower that began operation in 1858 to replace the  tower originally built in 1826. The United States Coast Guard decommissioned the light in 1974. In 1982 the Fire Island Lighthouse Preservation Society (FILPS) was formed to preserve the lighthouse. FILPS raised over $1.2 million to restore the tower and light. On May 25, 1986 the United States Coast Guard returned the Fire Island Lighthouse to an active aid to navigation. On February 22, 2006, the light became a private aid to navigation. It continues to be on the nautical charts, but is operated and maintained by the Fire Island Lighthouse Preservation Society and not the USCG.  It was added to the National Register of Historic Places in 1981 and a boundary increase for the national historic district occurred in 2010.

It is listed as Fire Island Light, number 695, in the USCG light lists.

When the lighthouse was built it was on the edge of Fire Island Inlet and marked the western end of Fire Island.

The Archives Center at the Smithsonian National Museum of American History has a collection (#1055) of souvenir postcards of lighthouses and has digitized 272 of these and made them available online.  These include postcards of Fire Island Light with links to customized nautical charts provided by National Oceanographic and Atmospheric Administration.

The lighthouse celebrated its 150th anniversary in 2008, the same year as the 100th anniversary of Robert Moses State Park.

Access

The lighthouse can be accessed by a short walk from Robert Moses State Park – Field 5. It is open to the public daily. Tower tours are available for a small fee.

In popular culture
From 1970 to 1975, the lighthouse and its surrounding area were seen in the opening and closing credits sequences of the CBS television soap opera The Guiding Light.

Some of the final episode of season 1 of TV show The Following was filmed at Fire Island Lighthouse and surrounding buildings.

Men in Black II also included some filming on the island in the immediate vicinity of the lighthouse.

A 1999 Channel 4 TV series featuring Stephen Fry and called Fire Island included filming of the lighthouse.

The 2008 movie What Happens in Vegas with Cameron Diaz and Ashton Kutcher featured the lighthouse as the Diaz character's favorite place.

See also
 List of lighthouses in the United States – New York

References

External links
 
 Fire Island Lighthouse Preservation Society
 Fire Island National Seashore: Fire Island Lighthouse
 Fire Island Lighthouse at Lighthousefriends.com

Lighthouses completed in 1826
Lighthouses completed in 1858
Fire Island, New York
Lighthouses on the National Register of Historic Places in New York (state)
Tourist attractions on Long Island
1826 establishments in New York (state)
National Register of Historic Places in Suffolk County, New York
Lighthouses in Suffolk County, New York